The Ecuadorian Navy is an Ecuadorian entity responsible for the surveillance and protection of national maritime territory and has a personnel of 9,400 men to protect a coastline of 2,237 km which reaches far into the Pacific Ocean. The vessels are identified by a ship prefix of B.A.E.:  (Ship of the Ecuadorian Navy) or L.A.E.:  (Boat of the Ecuadorian Navy).

Mission 
Organize, train, equip and maintain naval capabilities, as well as to assist and support all procedures involving national security and development. Contribute to the achievement of safeguarding national objectives in times of peace and war.

Vision 
Maintain highly trained naval forces to secure victory within the maritime zone in order to support developing communities. As a consequence operate highly qualified military personnel whom are able to fulfill this role based on elevated moral, values and principles.

History 
The roots of the Ecuadorian Navy or  date back to 1823 whilst forming a part of the Gran Colombian fleet. The government of President Eloy Alfaro (1906–1911) made one of the most notable naval acquisitions of the time, the torpedo ship , with the aim of restoring the navy. In 1832 the by then, Ecuadorian congress established officially "The Ecuadorian Maritime Department". On 25 July 1941 during the Ecuadorian–Peruvian War, the gunboat  commanded by Rafael Morán Valverde encountered the Peruvian destroyer Almirante Villar in the Jambeli channel. The Ecuadorian gunboat opened fire on Villar, keeping its distance while doing shots for elevation, but the Peruvian destroyer returned fire for the duration of the chase, which was ended by the Peruvians when the Calderon took refuge in the channels. The Calderon was unharmed in the skirmish and according to Ecuador, the Peruvian Villar suffered from damages, allegation that has always been refuted by Perú. However, this event had no influence over the general outcome of the war as Puerto Bolivar was lost to Peruvian Troops only two days later.

Present day 
Today, the Ecuadorian Navy is a compact, efficient and well-balanced force. However, limited funds hinder any major acquisitions and the chances of maintaining a strong force within the Pacific Ocean. Since introduction of a restructuring program within the Armed Forces, ("PATRIA I"), the Navy's structure became simplified. It supervises the Pacific Coast and Galápagos Islands all in one naval zone. Most seagoing assets are based at Guayaquil.

Active ships 
Currently  the Navy consists of the following vessels:

Naval Weapon Systems

Naval aviation
The Ecuadorian Naval Aviation (Aviación Naval Ecuatoriana) was formed in 1967 with fixed wing aircraft and received some helicopters in 1973. It remains the least effective section of the navy; capable of performing limited maritime patrol missions, it consists of fixed wing and a rotary wing element. Aircraft are based at Base Aérea Simón Bolívar in Guayaquil and the Eloy Alfaro Air Base in Manta. The most recent acquisition of the ANE are two Heron 1 and four Searcher Mk. III from Israel. These have increased the Navy's coastal surveillance capacity significantly.

Active aircraft
Currently  the Navy consists of the following aircraft:

Coast Guard
The Coast Guard (Cuerpo de Guardacostas de la Armada) became fully operational in 1980. Their mission is to control maritime activities on national territory, including all river zones. The objective is the internal security, protection of human life at sea and environmental protection. It disposes of around 250 men and 30 major as well as 40 smaller, partially very modern patrol vessels.
In 2011 Ecuador ordered four  patrol vessels based on the Damen Stan 2600 design for the Coast Guard.

Marines
The Naval Infantry Corps (Cuerpo de Infanteria de Marina) was formed on 12 November 1962. It maintains a strength of around 1700 marines, with their HQ in Guayaquil. The units are individually spread across the naval coast of Ecuador and are equipped with infantry support weapons, including 60 mm and 81 mm mortars, 106 mm recoilless rifles (RCLs) and Humvees. However, it lacks amphibious assault and sealift capacity. The Ecuadorian Marines are to maintain a high level of alert in order to execute special operations in difficult territory as well as to provide a fast response to counter amphibious incursions. Structure:

Escuela de la Infanteria Marina (Naval Infantry School)
Compañia de Seguridad "Guayaquil" (Security Detachment)
Batallon de Infanteria Marina "Jambeli"
Battallon de Infanteria Marina "San Eduardo"
Battallon de Infanteria Marina "San Lorenzo"
Battallon de Infanteria Marina "Jaramijo"
Battallon de Infanteria Marina "Esmeraldas"

Equipment gallery

Ranks

Commissioned officer ranks
The rank insignia of commissioned officers.

Other ranks
The rank insignia of non-commissioned officers and enlisted personnel.

See also 
Military of Ecuador
Bolivarian Armada of Venezuela
Colombian National Armada
Peruvian Navy

References

External links